"Oh, Dem Golden Slippers" is a minstrel song penned by African-American James A. Bland in 1879, is particularly well known as a bluegrass instrumental standard. By 1880, the song have exceeded the 100,000 copies sold.

Overview 

A minstrel show song set in the style of a spiritual, the song is apparently a parody of the spiritual "Golden Slippers", popularized after the American Civil War by the Fisk Jubilee Singers. Today "Oh, Dem Golden Slippers" is often referred to simply as "Golden Slippers", further obscuring the original spiritual. 

The song's first stanza tells of the protagonist setting aside such fine clothes as golden slippers, a long-tailed coat and a white robe for a chariot ride in the morning (presumably to Heaven). This leads to the refrain: Oh, dem golden slippers! / Oh, dem golden slippers! / Golden slippers I'm gwine to wear,  dey look so neat; / Oh, dem golden slippers! / Oh, dem golden slippers! / Golden slippers Ise gwine to wear, / To walk de golden street.

The second stanza describes the protagonist meeting up with other family members after his chariot ride.  In the third, the protagonist tells children to prepare themselves for their own chariot ride.

Lyrics

Oh, my golden slippers am laid away,
Kase I don't 'spect to wear 'em till my weddin' day,
And my long-tail'd coat, dat I loved so well,
I will wear up in de chariot in de morn;
And my long white robe dat I bought last June,
I'm gwine to git changed kase it fits too soon,
And de ole grey hoss dat I used to drive,
I will hitch him to de chariot in de morn.

[CHORUS]
Oh, dem golden slippers!
Oh, dem golden slippers!
Golden slippers I'm gwine to wear,
 dey look so neat;
Oh, dem golden slippers!
Oh, dem golden slippers!
Golden slippers Ise gwine to wear,
To walk de golden street.

Oh, my ole banjo hangs on de wall,
Kase it ain't been tuned since way last fall,
But de darks all say we will hab a good time,
When we ride up in de chariot in de morn;
Dars ole Brudder Ben and Sister Luce,
Dey will telegraph de news to Uncle Bacco Juice,
What a great camp meetin' der will be dat day,
When we ride up in de chariot in de morn.

[CHORUS]
So, it's good-bye, children, I will have to go
Whar de rain don't fall or de wind don't blow,
And yer ulster coats, why, yer will not need,
When yer ride up in de chariot in de morn;
But yer golden slippers must be nice and clean,
And yer age must be just sweet sixteen,
And yer white kid gloves yer will have to wear,
When yer ride up in de chariot in de mornin'.

Cultural references 

 The song is well-known today as the unofficial theme song of the Philadelphia Mummers Parade.
 The song, by then long in public domain, was used in early American television commercials for Golden Grahams cereal in the 1970s, with the refrain reworked in various ways around the phrase "Oh, those Golden Grahams".
 The Chorus of this song is performed by the musicians who can be seen in the Film Little Lord Fauntleroy.
 The Prince Myshkins, a folk duo, included a version of the song with new lyrics on their 2000 album "Shiny Round Object".
 A snippet of the song is sung during the "Steps of Life" sequence of the Ward Kimball short Melody.

References 

African-American cultural history
Blackface minstrel songs
History of Philadelphia
1879 songs
Songs written by James A. Bland